Mulek, according to the Book of Mormon, was the only surviving son of Zedekiah, the last King of Judah, after the Babylonian conquest of Jerusalem. The Book of Mormon states that after escaping from Judah, Mulek traveled to the Americas and established a civilization there.

The word Mulekite, after Mulek, is commonly used to refer to his group. It is one of four groups (the others being the Nephites, the Lamanites, and the Jaredites) described in the Book of Mormon as having settled in the ancient Americas, although Mulekites does not appear in the Book of Mormon itself. However, no archaeological evidence distinguishing these groups from other ancient American inhabitants has been documented in the scientific community.

Mulek and his nation
According to the Book of Mormon, when Jerusalem was destroyed by Babylon, during the reign of Zedekiah, all of the sons of Zedekiah were killed except Mulek. Along with "as many as would hearken unto the voice of the Lord," Mulek escaped into the wilderness, traveled "across the great waters" to the Americas, and founded a new nation. The people of Mulek established their capital at Zarahemla, north of where Lehi and his people landed.

In the text of the Book of Mormon, the Mulekites are referred to as the "people of Zarahemla."

Encounter with Jaredites
The last surviving Jaredite, Coriantumr, encountered the Mulekites, "and he dwelt with them for the space of nine moons" before he died.

Encounter with Nephites
When the Nephites were commanded to leave their historic homeland of Lehi-Nephi to flee from the Lamanites, the exiled remnants discovered the city of Zarahemla, to their north. The Book of Mormon records that the Mulekites spoke a language that was largely unintelligible to the Nephites. When taught the Nephite language, the Mulekites recounted their descent from Mulek, which was then recorded.

The Mulekites had in their possession a stone that told the story of Coriantumr, a survivor of the Jaredites who had encountered the Mulekites and lived among them until his death. Much of the prior Mulekite history was lost because of their lack of records.

Assimilation with Nephites
The Nephites settled among the Mulekites. The Mulekites eventually adopted the Nephites' language and religion, and the two peoples formed one nation by establishing Zarahemla as their new capital and naming the Nephite Mosiah as their king.

Possible origin of the name 
Hugh Nibley relates the name to his royal origins, and states:

"The word 'malek' is 'king' but the word 'mulek' [mulaik] means 'dear little king'. The Mulekites were the people who had the little king with them; they were rather proud of that."

Of the Mulekites, he says they are the "Mulekiah, which means 'the king people'".

References

Book of Mormon people